Document Freedom Day (DFD) is an annual event to "celebrate and raise awareness of Open Standards". It is celebrated on the last Wednesday of March each year. Document Freedom Day was first celebrated on 26 March 2008, and has continued to be celebrated every year since.

Document Freedom Day is organised by a team of volunteers of the Digital Freedom Foundation since 2016. It was previously organised by the Free Software Foundation Europe. DFD is funded by donors and partners which vary from year to year.

DFD 2013 was the largest ever with 60 events in 30 countries. A year later, in 2014, 51 groups in 22 countries held events celebrating Document Freedom Day. In 2019 it took place on Wednesday 27 March.

Relationship to free software 

Document Freedom Day is a campaign about open standards and document formats, aimed at a non-technical audience. Open standards ensure communication is independent of software vendor; this, in turn, ensures that people "are able to communicate and work using Free Software."

Document freedom addresses much more than just essays and spreadsheets, it is about control of any kind of a digital data - including artwork, sheet and recorded music, email, and statistics. These can be stored in ways which empower users, but they can also be stored in formats which constrain and manipulate users at enormous cost. Documents that are not free are locked to some particular software or company. The author cannot choose how to use them because they are controlled by technical restrictions.

Relationship to open standards 

According to Document Freedom volunteers, "Open Standards are essential for interoperability and freedom of choice based on the merits of different software applications. They provide freedom from data lock-in and the subsequent supplier lock-in. This makes Open Standards essential for governments, companies, organisations and individual users of information technology."

Document Freedom Day organizers have their own definition of technical standards that are considered to be open. These require standards to be:

 Subject to full public assessment and use without constraints in a manner equally available to all parties;
 Without any components or extensions that have dependencies on formats or protocols that do not meet the definition of an open standard themselves;
 Free from legal or technical clauses that limit its utilisation by any party or in any business model;
 Managed and further developed independently of any single supplier in a process open to the equal participation of competitors and third parties;
 Available in multiple complete implementations by competing suppliers, or as a complete implementation equally available to all parties.

Past dates 
 26 March 2008
 25 March 2009
 31 March 2010
 30 March 2011
 28 March 2012
 27 March 2013
 26 March 2014
 25 March 2015
 30 March 2016
 29 March 2017
 28 March 2018
 27 March 2019
 25 March 2020
 30 March 2022

See also 
 Digital dark age
 OpenDocument
 Portable Document Format
 LibreOffice
 Apache OpenOffice
 Calligra Suite
 KOffice
 Software Freedom Day
 Hardware Freedom Day
 Culture Freedom Day

References

External links 
 
 Free Software Foundation Europe Campaigns

Open formats
March observances
Recurring events established in 2008
Intellectual property activism
Unofficial observances
International observances